Buderim is the central suburb of the town of Buderim in the Sunshine Coast Region, Queensland, Australia.

It is the central suburb of the town of Buderim and comprises 63% of Buderim's urban population.

History 

The suburb takes its name from the Kabi language word badderam meaning red soil and red honeysuckle (a species of Banksia) Kabi language, Undanbi group.  Refer J.G. Steele. Aboriginal pathways.  Brisbane, 1983, p. 179.

Buderim Mountain Provisional School on 5 July 1875. Circa 1887 it became Buderim Mountain State School.

Buderim Methodist Church was established in 1907 on the corner of Gloucester Road and King Street. A new church was built in 1963 as an extension of the old church. Following the amalgamation of the Methodist Church into the Uniting Church in Australia in 1977, it became the Buderim Uniting Church. The current church building was built in 1998. On 3 February 2013 the church established a Garden of Remembrance for the interment of cremated ashes.

Buderim Road State School opened on 7 February 1916 but was quickly renamed Mons State School. It closed in 1974.

Immanuel Lutheran College opened on 30 January 1979.

Matthew Flinders Anglican College opened on 1 November 1989.

Aboriginal and Torres Strait Islander people made up 1.1% of the population. 72.3% of people were born in Australia. The next most common countries of birth were England 7.3%, New Zealand 4.7%, South Africa 1.6%, Scotland 0.7% and Germany 0.7%. 90.2% of people spoke only English at home. Other languages spoken at home included German 0.6% and Afrikaans 0.5%. The most common responses for religion were No Religion 31.1%, Catholic 19.4% and Anglican 18.2%. The population is mostly of people of European descent. Buderim has the largest communities of Australians with English (13,685; 32.9%), Irish (4,059; 9.8%), Scottish (3,885; 9.3%), German (1,955; 4.7%), Dutch (586; 2.0%), and Welsh ancestry (313; 1.1%) out of any suburb in Queensland.

Heritage listings 
Buderim has a number of heritage-listed sites, including:
 5 Ballinger Crescent: Pioneer Cottage
 12 Dixon Road: Canambie Homestead
 10 Orme Road: Buderim House
 Telco Road: Palmwoods-Buderim Tramway

Amenities 
Buderim Uniting Church is at 2-10 Gloucester Road.

References

External links 

 

Suburbs of the Sunshine Coast Region
Buderim